Jonathan Kreinik is an American record producer, who has produced numerous records from his Boombox Magnetica Studio(s), as well as in different studio locations around the globe. He has worked with the bands !!!, Trans Am, The Make-Up, and Frodus, among others. On occasion he is a traveling live-sound engineer for such bands as The Rapture, Elefant, Le Tigre, and Rocket From The Crypt.

Kreinik is originally from Washington, D.C.

Discography
AKA JK "Someone Out There..." EP written, recorded and mixed by JK, performed and produced by JK and Vito Roccoforte, Throne Of Blood
Jonathan Kreinik "Drone Tape" Single written, performed and recorded, on Swedish Columbia
Jonathan Kreinik Return To Precinct 13 EP written, performed, programmed and produced Boombox Magnetica on Swedish Columbia
Las Palabras mixed 2 songs for 7" at Boombox Magnetica, on Fox Hollow Recordings
Jonathan Kreinik (JNTHN) "Darklight" EP written, performed, programmed and produced Boombox Magnetica on Swedish Columbia
Make Up recorded and mixed bonus material for "In Film/On Video DVD. Recorded BMBX/Mixed Upstairs, on Dischord
Wizardry - "s/t", 2009
The MFA - Remix, Border Community, 2009
Extra Golden - Mixed "Thank You Very Quickly" on Thrill Jockey, 2009
The Cassettes - Recorded and Mixed "Countach", 2008
Extra Golden - Mixed "Hera Ma Nono" Full Length on Thrill Jockey, 2007
Supersystem - Recorded and mixed "A Million Microphones" full-length on Touch & Go, 2006
The Cassettes - 'Neath the Pale Moon / Boombox Magnetica Mobile @ Upstairs Studio, 2005
Le Tigre - Live recordings all around the world / Boombox Magnetica Mobile
El Vez - Live recording for upcomping comp @ Boombox Magnetica Mobile
The Cassettes - Recorded and mixed song for compilation on Desoto Records @ Upstairs, Boombox Magnetica Mobile
Hot Snakes - Recorded some vocals, organ (played/recorded) and guitar for the track "Audit In Progress" on Swami records @ Drag Racist
Out Hud - Recorded and sound designed drums/synths @ National Recording Studio, DC (NRS)
The Apes - Recorded Baba's Mountain for Birdman Recordings @ NRS
Certainly, Sir - Songs for LP on Rallye @ NRS
Supersystem - Mixed/processed 2 songs for 12"/Full Length on Touch and Go @ NRS
Measles Mumps Rubella - Recorded and Mixed Fantastic Success LP @ NRS, Boombox Magnetica, Popcorn, Revitte's
!!! - Single Mix for "Pardon My Freedom" and some tracking for LP on Warp/Touch and Go @ NRS
Measles Mumps Rubella - Recorded and mixed Fountain of Youth 12" on Troubleman @ NRS
Black Taj - Recorded for full-length on Amish Records @ NRS
Aim of Conrad - 5 songs for EP on Iodine @ NRS
The Oranges Band - Recorded "My Street" for LP on Lookout!! @ NRS
Mount Simms - Remix w/Memoryboy, "How We Do" @ Boombox Magnetica w/ John Selway on Emperor Norton under the name Memoryboy vs. Limousine Unlimited
!!! - "Me And Giuliani" 12" for Warp/Touch and Go 12" @ NRS and Boombox Magnetica
The American - 11 song CD @ NRS
302 Acid - Tracked @ NRS
Aim Of Conrad - 4 songs recording @ NRS
Early Humans - 4 song recording @ NRS
Scientology - 7 song 8-track Boombox Mobile recording, mixed at Pirate House
Trans Am - "TA" for Thrill Jockey @ NRS
TanLine - Boombox Macintoshica 1999-2000 CD
Hot Cross - Produced 24 track recording at Recording Arts w/Nikhil Ranade
EBSK - Boombox Macintoshica recording for Mobstar Records
Maestro Echoplex - 16 track recording @ NRS
Calibos - A portion of the 16 track recording and mixing for Handhled Records
Pines of Nowhere - 7" 16 track NRS/ Boombox Pro Tools recording for Level Plane w/Nikhil Ranade
Trans Am - A portion of the album "Red Line", 16 track NRS recording
Pines of Nowhere - 16 track s/t on Slowdime w/Nikhil Ranade @ NRS recording
Calibos - 16 track NRS rec. for Arlingtone Records
The Movies - 16 track recording @ NRS for BCORE Spain/Gern Blandsten Records
Calibos - 8 track recording @ Boombox
Frodus - "Disco" split single w/Atomic Fireball 8-track NRS recording for Lovitt Records
Trans Am - Futureworld 24 track LP for thrill jockey @ WGNS
Nate Burke - solo 8 track demos featuring Nathan from Out_Circuit and Ludde from INC @ Boombox Magnetica
The Impossible 5 - 8 track recording unreleased, Boombox Magnetica
The Make-Up - Re-recorded vocals for "I Want Some" from a beach zombie movie @ Boombox Magnetica
The Make-Up - 8-track "Little Black Book" 7" for K @ Boombox Magnetica
Low Numbers - 24 track, 3 song demo @ WGNS
EngineDown - 6 songs for Lovitt Records, 2 released as "Castalia" 7"/8 track
Knodel - 16 songs with Phil Manley/8 track on Spongebath* @ the Bridge
Frodus Conglomerate International - Produced, Engineered by Bruce Kane. 13 song, 24trk, Album for Tooth and Nail Records @ Sterling Productions in Sterling, Virginia
Treiops Treyfid Experience - 1 song, 8trk, for web release* @ Boombox Mobile
Trans Am - Futureworld demos / live to 2 track
Les Trois Malheures 8 or 9 songs, done and redone/8 track*
The Impossible 5 "Rally Race" single for Lovitt Records/8 track*
Frodus - 2 songs for Day After Records (Czech Republic)/8 track
Frodus - 2 songs for split with Roadside Monument/Tooth and Nail/16 track @ WGNS
Frodus - 2 songs for a flexi, Tooth & Nail+Muddle Fanzine/ 8 track
The Travellers of Tyme - Song for Sub Culture Sucks Back comp, one for The Shadows tribute CD/LP (MuSick Recordings)/8 track
The Jerks - Song for Sub Culture Sucks Back comp/8 track*
Spore - Live to 2 track *
Run for Tin
Karate side project, 3 song demo/24 track
Juniper - A few singles worth, for Orange, Turntable Friend and Fantastic/8 track*
Guided By Voices - Mixes w/G.Turner for "GvsB vs. GBV," Radiopaque/16 track
Victory At Sea - 16 track demo 1996
Pork Trimmer - 6 song tape 1993
Les Trois Malheures - 6 song tape 1997
Rosa Chancewell - 2 song Samuel side project for Art Monk Construction Records 1996
Sick Sick Six - 8 track 1996
Swordplay - 24 track 1995
Ambush at Junction Rock - 24 track* 1995

References

External links
Boombox Magnetica Online Official website
TapeOp Interview 2006 Archived Interview @ themindcontrol.com

Record producers from Washington, D.C.
Living people
Year of birth missing (living people)